Curtis Peagler (September 17, 1929 — December 19, 1992) was an American jazz saxophonist who specialized in straight-ahead jazz and hard bop.

Early life 
Peagler was born in Cincinnati, Ohio. He played in the blues genre during the first phase of his career, before joining the U.S. Army for two years from 1953 to 1955.

Career 
Around 1960 Peagler led a band called the Modern Jazz Disciples, which specialized in hard bop. The band included a euphonium and normaphone player, William "Hicky" Kelley, an unusual instrument for jazz musicians to play during the era. The Disciples recorded two albums: the self-titled Modern Jazz Disciples (1959) and Right Down Front (1962). Peagler recorded as a member of Lem Winchester's sextet that recorded the album Lem's Beat in 1960, just a year before the vibraphone player died of a gun accident.

Peagler moved to Los Angeles in 1962. After playing with Ray Charles during the late 1960s, he became a member of Count Basie's Band during the 1970s. He played in Cheatham's Sweet Baby Blues Band, led by Jeanie and Jimmy Cheatham, shortly before his death.

Death 
In 1992, Peagler died following heart surgery at Cedars-Sinai Medical Center in Los Angeles.

Legacy 
Jazz critic Leonard Feather described Peagler as "an exciting, extrovert saxophonist who lent color to every band he played in, from Ray Charles in the 1960s to Count Basie in the ‘70s." James Nadal referred to him as "a solid, hard working sax man whose performance and recording resume was quite impressive."

Discography

As leader 

 For Basie and Duke (1982)
 I'll Be Around (1986)
 Disciples Blues (2001)

As sideman

With Count Basie 

 Have a Nice Day (1971)

With Ray Charles 

 My Kind of Jazz (1970)

With Jimmy Cheatham 

 Sweet Baby Blues (1985)

With Freddie Redd 

 Everybody Loves a Winner (1990)

With Mel Tormé 

 Night at the Concord Pavilion (1990)

With Lem Winchester 

 Lem's Beat (1960)

References 

African-American jazz musicians
American jazz alto saxophonists
American male saxophonists
Hard bop musicians
Hard bop saxophonists
Jazz alto saxophonists
1929 births
1992 deaths
Prestige Records artists
People from Cincinnati
Musicians from Ohio
20th-century American musicians
20th-century saxophonists
American male jazz musicians
20th-century American male musicians